Archduke Rainer  Ferdinand Maria Johann Evangelist Franz Ignaz of Austria (11 January 1827 – 27 January 1913), a member of the House of Habsburg-Lorraine and nephew of Emperor Francis II, was an Austrian politician who served as Minister-President of Austria from 1861 to 1865.  Later in his life, he took up the collection of preserved papyri, largely from Egypt, and served as a benefactor and patron while working with the Oriental studies department of the University of Vienna.  His purchases of papyri from Egypt formed the Rainer collection at the Austrian National Library.

Biography
Born in Milan, the capital of the Austrian Kingdom of Lombardy–Venetia, he was a son of Viceroy Archduke Rainer of Austria (1783–1853) and his consort Princess Elisabeth of Savoy (1800–1856). Rainer spent most of his youth at the Royal Villa of Monza. He studied law at the University of Vienna and in 1843 joined the Austrian Imperial Army in the rank of an Oberst (Colonel).

In 1852, he married his cousin Archduchess Maria Karoline of Austria (1825–1915), a daughter of Archduke Charles, known for his victory at the 1809 Battle of Aspern. The marriage was a very happy one, and, with numerous public appearances and charitable activities, the couple was probably the most popular amongst the Habsburg family. The lavish celebration of their diamond wedding in 1912 was rated as one of the last great events of the Austro-Hungarian Monarchy before World War I. The marriage however, remained childless. 

In 1854, Rainer achieved the rank of Generalmajor in the Imperial Army and in 1861 was raised to Feldmarschall-Leutnant (Field marshal lieutenant).   In 1857, Archduke Rainer was appointed president of the Austrian Imperial Council by Emperor Francis Joseph I. In the course of the implementation of the 1861 February Patent constitution, he took up office as nominal Minister-President chairing the liberal cabinet of State Minister Anton von Schmerling.

He was popular with the nonaristocratic population of Vienna, often walking the streets on foot.

Papyrus collection

While Rainer's military and political career was largely forgotten, his interest in art and science proved more lasting.  Later in his life, Archduke Rainer became interested in the emerging science of papyrology, the study of preserved papyrus in the deserts of Egypt that offered primary source documents from centuries earlier.  In 1878–1879, the Viennese dealer in antiquities  purchased recently found papyri from Faiyum, known as Arsinoe in the Hellenistic period.  Graf contacted Professor of Oriental History at the University of Vienna  and arranged the shipping of around 10,000 papyri to him.  The papyri made their way to Vienna in 1881 and 1882 while awaiting a buyer; at the end of 1883, Archduke Rainer agreed to purchase the papyri.  Professor Karabacek managed and processed both the sale and the collection.  The collection was initially stored at the Österreichischen Museum für Kunst und Industrie (the predecessor of the modern Museum of Applied Arts).  Archduke Rainer continued to expand the collection with new purchases that Graf arranged, including papyri from digs at Hermopolis, Heracleopolis Magna, and other sites in the Faiyum area such as Soknopaiou Nesos.  Rainer gifted the collection to his uncle Emperor Franz Joseph I of Austria on August 18, 1899 as a birthday present.  At Rainer's request, Franz Joseph incorporated them as a special collection at the Imperial and Royal Court Library (now known as the Austrian National Library).  Rainer's vast purchases provided the core of the collection that still exists today as one of the most significant collection of papyri in the world.  The Rainer collection at the Austrian National Library was given the honour of becoming part of the UNESCO Memory of the World Register in 2001.

Honours and awards 
Austro-Hungarian
 Knight of the Golden Fleece, 1852
 Grand Cross of the Royal Hungarian Order of St. Stephen, 1862
 Military Merit Cross, in Diamonds
 Bronze Military Merit Medal on Red Ribbon

Foreign

Ancestry

References

1827 births
1913 deaths
19th-century Ministers-President of Austria
Nobility from Milan
House of Habsburg-Lorraine
Austrian princes
Knights of the Golden Fleece of Austria
Grand Crosses of the Order of Saint Stephen of Hungary
Grand Crosses of the Order of the Star of Romania
Honorary Knights Grand Cross of the Royal Victorian Order
Grand Crosses of the Order of Saint-Charles
Recipients of the Order of the Netherlands Lion